The 30th Field Artillery Regiment, RCA is a bilingual Canadian Army (Primary Reserve) artillery regiment located in Ottawa, Ontario, and is allocated to 33 Canadian Brigade Group, 4th Canadian Division. The unit parades at a new complex at the Canadian Forces Support Unit (Ottawa) - Uplands Site following the collapse of their former location at CFRB Dows Lake under the weight of snow in 2009. The unit performs ceremonial gun salute duties when required in the National Capital area, and is a field unit equipped with 105 mm Howitzers, C3.

Allocated batteries
1st Field Battery, RCA, the Leadership and Recruit Training Battery (internal designation)
2nd Field Battery, RCA, the Firing Battery (internal designation)

Lineage
Originated by/from the 2nd "Ottawa" Battery on 27 Sept, 1855

30th Field Artillery Regiment, RCA
Originated 9 May 1905 in Ottawa, Ontario as the 8th Brigade of Field Artillery, CA
Redesignated 2 February 1920 as the 1st Brigade, CFA
Redesignated 1 July 1925 as the 1st Field Brigade, CA
Redesignated 3 June 1935 as the 1st Field Brigade, RCA
Redesignated 7 November 1940 as the 1st (Reserve) Field Brigade, RCA
Redesignated 1 March 1943 as the 1st (Reserve) Field Regiment, RCA
Redesignated 1 April 1946 as the 30th Field Regiment, RCA
Redesignated 12 April 1960 as the 30th Field Artillery Regiment, RCA

There is no lineal connection to previous artillery units in Ottawa.  (British North American Act, 27 Sept 1855) basis for Artillery units continuously located in Ottawa since 1855, officially. Artillery unit established by British government prior to 1855.

Operational history

The 1st Field Artillery Brigade, CFA, CEF was authorized on 6 August 1914 and embarked for Britain on 27 September 1914. It disembarked in France on 12 February 1915, where it provided artillery support as part of the 1st Canadian Division's Divisional Artillery in France and Flanders until the end of the war. The brigade disbanded on 23 October 1920.

War In Afghanistan
The regiment contributed individual augmentees to the various Task Forces which served in Afghanistan between 2002 and 2014.

UN Missions 

 UNMOGIP - India/Pakistan
 UNEF 2 - Egypt
 UNDOF - Golan Heights
 UNFICYP - Cyprus
 UNPROFOR - Former Republic of Yugoslavia
 SFOR - Bosnia-Herzegovina
 MONUC - Congo

Domestic Operations 
Members of the unit have taken part in:

 Operation Lentus - Ontario and Quebec (2019 and 2017)
 Operation Cadence - Ontario (2011)
 Operation Recuperation - Ontario (1998)
 Operation Assistance - Manitoba (1997).

Museum
In 2013, the regiment officially established and had certified, a regimental museum called The Bytown Gunners Firepower Museum.   Since that time, this museum has continued to develop into a significant OMMC military museum open to the general public based upon reservations.

Notable people 

 Lieutenant-Colonel John McCrae, MD (30 November 1872 – 28 January 1918) best known for writing the famous war memorial poem In Flanders Fields. At the outbreak of the First World War he immediately volunteered for service either as a doctor or as a gunner. He achieved both; he was appointed surgeon to the 1st Brigade, Canadian Field Artillery. The 1st Brigade, Canadian Field Artillery, now disbanded, is perpetuated by the 30th Field Artillery Regiment.
 Lieutenant-General (Ret'd) Andrew Leslie CMM MSC MSM CD , retired Canadian Armed Forces lieutenant-general who served as Chief of Transformation and earlier as Chief of the Land Staff. He was the Member of Parliament for the riding of Orléans, from the October 19, 2015, federal election until he stood down at the 2019 Canadian federal election. He joined the 30th Field Artillery Regiment in 1977 while at the University of Ottawa. In 1981 he transferred to the Regular Force.

Precedence

See also

 Military history of Canada
 History of the Canadian Army
 Canadian Forces
 List of armouries in Canada

References

External links
 The Royal Regiment of Canadian Artillery (RCA) site
 Unit page on Canadian Army site

Field artillery regiments of Canada
Military units and formations established in 1946
Military units and formations of Ontario